The following is a list of state-accredited seaside resorts in Germany. They are first sorted by seas (Baltic and North Sea), then by German states (Länder), then by districts (Landkreise). After every resort's name, the officially designated status is mentioned in German language (e.g. "Ostseeheilbad").

For a complete list of inland and coastal spas, see List of spa towns in Germany.

Baltic Sea

Mecklenburg-Vorpommern 
Mecklenburg-Vorpommern features Germany's longest coastal area, with a total of 2000 km. A part of the state's coast with its historical spas is promoted as the "German Riviera".

Nordwestmecklenburg  
 Boltenhagen – Ostseeheilbad
 Insel Poel – Ostseebad

District and city of Rostock  
 Graal-Müritz – Ostseeheilbad
 Heiligendamm, town of Bad Doberan – Ostseeheilbad
 Kühlungsborn – Ostseeheilbad
 Nienhagen – Ostseebad
 Rerik – Ostseebad
 City of Rostock
 Diedrichshagen
 Hohe Düne
 Markgrafenheide
 Warnemünde – Ostseebad

Vorpommern-Greifswald  
 Lubmin – Ostseebad
 Ueckermünde – Seebad
On Usedom Island:
 Amber Spas:
 Koserow – Ostseebad
 Loddin – Ostseebad
 Ückeritz – Ostseebad
 Zempin – Ostseebad
 Kaiserbad:
 Ahlbeck, municipality of Heringsdorf – Ostseeheilbad
 Bansin on Usedom Island, Heringsdorf municipality – Ostseeheilbad
 Heringsdorf – Ostseeheilbad
 Karlshagen – Ostseebad
 Trassenheide – Ostseebad
 Zinnowitz – Ostseeheilbad

Vorpommern-Rügen  
 Dierhagen – Ostseeheilbad
 Insel Hiddensee – Ostseebad
On Fischland-Darss-Zingst peninsula:
 Ahrenshoop – Ostseeheilbad
 Born a. Darß - Seebad
 Prerow – Ostseebad
 Wieck a. Darß - Seebad
 Wustrow– Ostseeheilbad
 Zingst – Seeheilbad
On Rugia Island:
 Baabe – Ostseebad
 Binz – Ostseebad
 Breege mit Juliusruh – Ostseebad
 Göhren – Ostseebad
 Lauterbach, town of Putbus - Ostseebad
 Sassnitz - Ostseebad
 Sellin – Ostseebad
 Thiessow – Ostseebad

Schleswig-Holstein

Lübeck  
 Travemünde, city of Lübeck – Ostseeheilbad

Ostholstein  
 Burg auf Fehmarn, municipality of Fehmarn – Ostseeheilbad
 Dahme – Ostseeheilbad
 Grömitz – Ostseeheilbad
 Großenbrode – Ostseeheilbad
 Haffkrug, municipality of Scharbeutz – Ostseeheilbad
 Heiligenhafen – Ostseeheilbad
 Kellenhusen – Ostseeheilbad
 Neustadt in Holstein – Ostseebad
 Niendorf, municipality of Timmendorfer Strand – Ostseeheilbad
 Scharbeutz – Ostseeheilbad
 Sierksdorf – Ostseebad
 Timmendorfer Strand – Ostseeheilbad
 Weissenhäuser Strand, municipality of Wangels – Ostseebad

Plön  
 Heikendorf – Ostseebad
 Hohwacht (Ostsee) – Ostseeheilbad
 Laboe – Ostseebad
 Schönberg (Holstein) mit Holm – Ostseebad

Rendsburg-Eckernförde  
 Damp – Ostseebad
 Eckernförde – Ostseebad
 Strande – Ostseebad
 Schönhagen, municipality of Brodersby – Ostseebad

Schleswig-Flensburg  
 Glücksburg – Ostseeheilbad

North Sea

Lower Saxony

Aurich (East Frisia)  
Baltrum - Nordseeheilbad
Dornumersiel, municipality of Dornum - Nordseebad
Juist – Nordseeheilbad
Norddeich, town of Norden – Nordseeheilbad
Norderney – Nordseeheilbad

Cuxhaven (City and district)  
Cuxhaven, city - Nordseeheilbad
Duhnen, city of Cuxhaven
Otterndorf, Samtgemeinde Land Hadeln - Nordseebad
Wremen, Samtgemeinde Land Wursten - Nordseebad

Friesland (Frisia)  
Dangast, town of Varel - Nordseebad, Heilquellen-Kurbetrieb
Horumersiel-Schillig, municipality of Wangerland – Nordseeheilbad
Wangerooge – Nordseeheilbad

Leer (Ostfriesland)  
Borkum – Nordseeheilbad

Wesermarsch  
Burhave, municipality of Butjadingen – Nordseebad
Tossens, municipality of Butjadingen – Nordseebad

Wittmund (East Frisia)  
Bensersiel, Town of Esens – Nordseeheilbad
Carolinensiel-Harlesiel, town of Wittmund
Langeoog
Neuharlingersiel – Nordseeheilbad 
Spiekeroog – Nordseeheilbad

Schleswig-Holstein

Dithmarschen  
Friedrichskoog

Nordfriesland  
Amrum with Nebel, Norddorf and Wittdün
Nieblum
Nordstrand (Gemeinde)
Pellworm
Sankt Peter-Ording - Nordseeheilbad and Schwefelbad
Utersum
Wyk auf Föhr
On Sylt Island:
Hörnum (Sylt), Kreis Nordfriesland, Schleswig-Holstein – Nordseeheilbad
Kampen (Sylt) - Nordseebad
List (Sylt) - Seebad
Rantum (Sylt) - Nordseebad
Wenningstedt - Nordseebad
Westerland

Pinneberg  
Helgoland

Historical German seaside resorts

In modern Lithuania  
 Memel (nowadays called "Klaipėda", with Mellneraggen)
 Nidden ("Nida)
 Polangen ("Palanga")
 Preil ("Neringa")
 Schwarzort ("Juodkrantė")

In modern Poland  
 Cammin in Pommern ("Kamień Pomorski")
 Dievenow (Dziwnów)
 Henkenhagen ("Ustronie Morskie")
 Kolberg ("Kołobrzeg")
 Misdroy ("Międzyzdroje")
 Stolpmünde ("Ustka")
 Swinemünde ("Świnoujście")
 Zoppot ("Sopot")

In modern Russia  
 Cranz ("Zelenogradsk", with Rosehnen)
 Palmnicken ("Jantarny")
 Rauschen ("Svetlogorsk")
 Rossitten ("Rybachy")

See also 
List of spa towns in Germany
Tourism in Germany
Seaside resort
List of beaches

External links 

 Spa association Mecklenburg-Vorpommern (German)
 Spa association Niedersachsen (German)
 Spa association Schleswig-Holstein (German)
 International Association of Top Seaside Resorts, including Heringsdorf

References 

 
 
 
 
Seaside resorts
Germany
Seaside resorts
Seaside resorts
Germany
Atlantic Ocean-related lists